Hiệp Hòa (lit. "harmonization", 1 November 1847 – 29 November 1883), born Nguyễn Phúc Hồng Dật, was the sixth emperor of the Vietnamese Nguyễn dynasty and reigned for 3 months and 29 days (30 July 1883 – 29 November 1883).

Hiệp Hòa was the 29th son of Emperor Thiệu Trị. After his nephew Dục Đức was deposed by court officials following a three-day reign in 1883, he reasserted the family's claim on the throne. However, he presided over his nation's defeat by the French Navy at the Battle of Thuận An in August 1883, and on 25 August 1883 he signed the Treaty of Huế which made Vietnam a protectorate of France, ending Vietnam's independence. For this, he was deposed and forced by officials to commit suicide.

References 

 

1883 deaths
Emperors of Nguyen Vietnam
Nguyen dynasty emperors
1847 births
19th-century Vietnamese monarchs
Vietnamese monarchs